The following is a list of the buildings on the campus of Butler University in Indianapolis, Indiana, United States.

Academic Buildings

Arthur Jordan Memorial Hall-Known on campus as "Jordan Hall," built in honor of Arthur Jordan.
Fairbanks Center-Named in honor of Richard M. Fairbanks; houses the College of Communication.
Gallahue Hall-Named in honor of Edward and Dorothy Gallahue; houses all science classes.
Holcomb Building-Named in honor of James Irving Holcomb. Houses college of Business and the Science Library.
Irwin Library-Named in honor of the Irwin family, long-time contributors to the Butler Community.
Lilly Hall-Named in honor of the Lilly family, houses the School of Music.
Pharmacy and Health Sciences Building-Houses the College of Pharmacy.

Administrative Buildings
Atherton Union-Named in honor of John W. Atherton; houses numerous offices, as well as a dining court, and the bookstore.
Butler University Police Department
Robertson Hall-Built in honor of Alexander and Carrie Robinson, houses the Office of Admissions.

Arts and Entertainment Buildings
Eidson-Duckwell Recital Hall-Named in honor of Paul Duckwell and Iva Eidson Duckwell.
Clowes Memorial Hall-Not owned by Butler University, but on the University property.

Athletic Buildings
Butler Bubble-4 indoor tennis courts.
Health and Recreation Complex-Home to various recreational activities as well as the Health Offices.
Hinkle Fieldhouse-Butler's most historic building, named in honor of legendary coach Paul "Tony" Hinkle. Designated a National Historic Landmark in 1987.
Bulldog Park - Baseball facility used by the Butler Bulldogs baseball team

Religious Buildings
Center for Faith and Vocation

Residence Halls
Apartment Village
Residential College
Ross Residence Hall-Named in honor Maurice Ross, a former Butler President.
Schwitzer Hall-Named in honor of Louis Schwitzer, a University Donor. Demolished in 2017.
University Terrace
Irvington House

Fraternity Houses
Delta Tau Delta
Lambda Chi Alpha
Phi Delta Theta
Sigma Chi
Sigma Nu
Beta Theta Pi

Sorority Houses
Alpha Chi Omega
Alpha Phi
Delta Delta Delta
Delta Gamma
Kappa Alpha Theta
Kappa Kappa Gamma
Pi Beta Phi

References

External links

Campus Map
Residence Life
Greek Life

Butler University